Ardi Liives (until 1939 Liinev; 31 August 1929 in Tallinn – 9 December 1992 in Tallinn) was an Estonian writer and playwright.

Liives was the son of composer and violinist Eero Liives. He graduated from the University of Tartu's Faculty of Law. From 1953 until 1962, he worked in the editorial office of the newspaper Õhtuleht. After 1962 he was a professional writer.

Since 1958 he was a member of Estonian Writers' Union.

Works

 novel "Retro". Tallinn: Eesti Raamat, 1981, 240 pp
 novel "Vastuarmastus". Tallinn: Eesti Raamat, 1982, 190 pp
 novel "Vastuarmastus. 2". Tallinn: Eesti Raamat, 1986, 229 pp
 novel "Passioon". Tallinn: Eesti Raamat, 1986, 253 pp
 novel "Aken vastu päikest". Tallinn: Eesti Raamat, 1988, 239 pp

References

1929 births
1992 deaths
20th-century Estonian writers
Estonian male novelists
Estonian editors
Estonian male short story writers
Estonian dramatists and playwrights
University of Tartu alumni
Writers from Tallinn